The Designer Outlet West Midlands is an outlet shopping centre near Cannock, Staffordshire, England. 

It is owned by McArhurGlen Group and is the company's 7th designer outlet in the UK.

Permission was granted for the construction of the shopping centre in 2016 and work began in 2017. Due to the COVID-19 pandemic, the opening of the centre was delayed from Autumn 2020 to early 2021.

The centre officially opened to customers on Monday 12 April 2021.

Stores

The outlet consists of a range of designer brand stores offering clothing, beauty, homeware, gifts, and accessories at discounted prices. In January 2021 the centre was stated to be built and opened in two phases, with the first phase seeing the opening of around 80 stores along with a number of restaurants and cafes, and the second phase - to begin on or shortly after completion of the first - increasing the number of stores to around 130.

As of November 2022, there were around 56 stores and 5 restaurants listed on the official website:

Adidas, Asics, Beauty Outlet, Bedeck, BOSS, Calvin Klein, Clarks, Clogau Gold, Coach, Crew Clothing Company, Denby, Dune London, Eden Menswear, Gant, Guess, Haribo, Hobbs, Joules, Kate Spade New York, Kurt Geiger, Lacoste, Le Creuset, Levi's, Lindt, Luke 1977, Moda in Pelle, Molton Brown, Moss Bros, Mountain Warehouse, Nike, Paul Costelloe, Pavers, Phase Eight, Police, Portmeirion, ProCook, Puma, Radley, Reiss, Salt Rock, Sketchers, Sunglass Hut, Superdry, Ted Baker, The Cosmetics Company Store, Tommy Hilfiger, Under Armour, Vans, Watch Station, Yankee Candle.

Contact Coffee Co., Five Guys, Mac Daddy, Smoothies Plus UK, Starbucks, Wagamama and Slim Chickens.

Controversy

Sign

After completion of the buildings and car park. A sign was erected at the shopping outlet centre. However the sign was measured at being 50 ft tall and as a result. It dominates the skyline of Cannock and can be seen from further away. There have been many residents who have voiced their anger at the sign and one Councillor at Cannock Chase Council has started a petition to have the sign either taken down or reduced in size However, McArthurGlen who own the outlet have said they have legal permission to keep the sign in place as it was part of their original plans. Many locals have praised the style of the outlet, but have felt the sign is not in keeping with the local landscape and even exaggerated that it belongs in Las Vegas.

Name

There have been some criticism of the name being called the "Designer Outlet West Midlands" instead of it being named after Cannock or the county of Staffordshire.

Transport links

The shopping centre sits close to Cannock station on the Chase Line with services to Birmingham International, Birmingham New Street, Walsall and Rugeley Trent Valley on the West Coast Main Line as well as occasional services to Wolverhampton.

There are also regular buses which call into the three bus stops within the centre grounds. These run services to Burntwood, Lichfield, Cannock, Pye Green, Hednesford, Brownhills, Norton Canes Walsall and Birmingham. Service X51 (Cannock-Birmingham) is one of the few services which operate in Staffordshire on Sundays. Live departure screens are in situ at each stop for passenger information.

The nearest airport is Birmingham International and further ones include Manchester Airport and East Midlands Airport.

References

Outlet malls in England
Shopping centres in Staffordshire